Vsevolod Vitalyevich Vishnevsky (– 28 February 1951) was a Soviet and Russian writer, screenwriter, playwright and journalist.

Early life
He was born in 1900 in Saint Petersburg and educated at a Petersburg gymnasium. During World War I he enrolled in Baltic Fleet as sea cadet. He participated in the militant rebellion in Petrograd in 1917, in battles of the Russian Civil War as a machine gunner in the 1st Cavalry Army; he worked as political agitator attached to the Black Sea and Baltic fronts. During the German-Soviet War he participated in the defense of Leningrad.

Writing career
Later he became an editor of Krasnoflotets ("Red Fleet sailor") magazine. He battled at the fronts of Winter War and German-Soviet War, worked as war correspondent for Pravda newspaper. Since 1944 he worked as editor of Znamya magazine.

His first works were published in 1920. In 1929 his play The First Horse Army, which celebrated Marshal Semyon Budyonny's Rostov campaign during the civil war, was published. In 1930s he wrote many plays, including We Are from Kronstadt, Last Decisive, and his most famous play An Optimistic Tragedy (1934). In 1941, Vishnevsky was awarded the Stalin Prize.

Death
In the winter of 1950 Vishnevsky suffered two strokes. He died in Moscow in 1951 and was buried at the Novodevichy Cemetery.

Works
The First Horse Army
An Optimistic Tragedy
Last Decisive
We Are from Kronstadt
Unforgettable 1919
Battle at West
By the Walls of Leningrad
Sea Spread Wide
We, Russian People

Sources
 Banham, Martin, ed. 1998. The Cambridge Guide to Theatre. Cambridge: Cambridge UP. 1173. .

1900 births
1951 deaths
20th-century Russian dramatists and playwrights
20th-century Russian male writers
Communist Party of the Soviet Union members
Stalin Prize winners
Recipients of the Cross of St. George
Recipients of the Medal of St. George
Recipients of the Order of Lenin
Recipients of the Order of the Red Banner
Recipients of the Order of the Red Banner of Labour
Recipients of the Order of the Red Star
Male screenwriters
Socialist realism writers
Russian male dramatists and playwrights
Russian male writers
Russian memoirists
Russian military personnel of World War I
20th-century Russian screenwriters
Soviet dramatists and playwrights
Soviet male writers
Soviet military personnel of the Winter War
Soviet screenwriters
Soviet war correspondents
Burials at Novodevichy Cemetery